The Ariah Park railway station is a disused railway station on the Temora-Roto railway line in New South Wales, Australia.  It opened in 1906 and was the temporary terminus of the line between 1906 and 1908.

A turning triangle was provided behind the platform with various goods facilities and sidings. Wheat stacking sites were constructed between 1915 and 1918, and Ariah Park is notable as the first location in Australia to despatch wheat in bulk, a memorial on a freight wagon alongside an adjoining road commemorates this. In 1986, the triangle was removed and goods facilities were subsequently closed until Ariah Park became available for wheat loading only in 1994. The railway station was unattended after 1982. The railway station building survives in reasonable condition and was restored and repainted in 2006. There are plans to convert it into a museum.

References 

Disused regional railway stations in New South Wales
Railway stations in Australia opened in 1906